The Roman Catholic Archdiocese of Kisumu is the Latin Metropolitan See for the Ecclesiastical province of Kisumu in western Kenya.

The cathedral archiepiscopal see is St. Theresa’s Cathedral, in Kisumu, Kisumu County.

Statistics 
As per 2014, it pastorally served 898,036 Catholics (35.5% of 2,531,000 total on 4,616 km² in 41 parishes and a mission with 95 priests (70 diocesan, 25 religious), 349 lay religious (49 brothers, 300 sisters) and 35 seminarians.

Ecclesiastical province 
Its Suffragan sees are:
 Roman Catholic Diocese of Bungoma
 Roman Catholic Diocese of Eldoret, senior daughter
 Roman Catholic Diocese of Homa Bay
 Roman Catholic Diocese of Kakamega
 Roman Catholic Diocese of Kisii, daughter
 Roman Catholic Diocese of Kitale
 Roman Catholic Diocese of Lodwar

History 
 Established on 15 Jul 1925 as Apostolic Prefecture of Kavirondo, on territory split off from the then Apostolic Vicariate of Upper Nile in Uganda 
 Promoted on 27 May 1932 as Apostolic Vicariate of Kisumu
Promoted on 25 Mar 1953 as Diocese of Kisumu
 Lost territories repeatedly : on 29 Jun 1953 to establish the then Apostolic Prefecture of Eldoret, on 20 Oct 1959 to establish the then Apostolic Prefecture of Ngong, on 21 May 1960 to establish Diocese of Kisii, on 11 Jan 1968 to establish Diocese of Nakuru, on 27 Feb 1978 to establish Diocese of Kakamega
 Promoted on 21 May 1990 as Metropolitan Archdiocese of Kisumu

Bishops

Ordinaries 
(all Roman rite)

 Apostolic Prefect of Kavirondo 
 Gorgonio Brandsma, Mill Hill Missionaries (M.H.M.) (born Netherlands) (2 Dec 1925  – 27 May 1932 see below)

Apostolic  Vicars of Kisumu  
 Gorgonio Brandsma, M.H.M. ( see above 27 May 1932 – death 20 Jun 1935), Titular Bishop of Bargala (1933 – 20 Jun 1935)
 Nicolas Stam, M.H.M. (born Netherlands) (9 Mar 1936 – retired 1946), Titular Bishop of Cediæ (9 Mar 1936  – 26 May 1949); died 1949
 Frederick Hall, M.H.M. (born England, UK) (9 Apr 1948  – 25 Mar 1953 see below), Titular Bishop of Alba Marittima (9 Apr 1948  – 25 Mar 1953)

Suffragan Bishops of Kisumu  
 Frederick Hall, M.H.M. (see above 25 Mar 1953 – retired 2 Dec 1963), emeritate as Titular Bishop of Castra nova (2 Dec 1963 – resigned 27 Jul 1976), died 1988
 Joannes de Reeper, M.H.M. (born Netherlands) (16 Jan 1964 – retired 20 Mar 1976), died 1980; previously Apostolic Prefect of Ngong (Kenya) (15 Jan 1960  – 16 Jan 1964)
 Philip Sulumeti (first Kenyan incumbent) (9 Dec 1976  – 28 Feb 1978), succeeding as previous Titular Bishop of Urci (28 May 1972  – 9 Dec 1976) and Auxiliary Bishop of Kisumu (28 May 1972  – 9 Dec 1976); next Bishop of Kakamega (Kenya) (28 Feb 1978 – retired 5 Dec 2014)
 Zacchaeus Okoth (27 Feb 1978  – 21 May 1990 see below)

Metropolitan Archbishops of Kisumu 
 Zacchaeus Okoth (see above 21 May 1990 – retired 12 Jan 2019), also President of Kenya Conference of Catholic Bishops (1991 – 1997)
 Philip Arnold Subira Anyolo (12 Jan 2019 – 28 October 2021); next Metropolitan Archbishop of Nairobi (28 October 2021- ...)

Auxiliary Bishops
Maurice Michael Otunga (1956-1960), appointed Bishop of Kisii; future Cardinal
Philip Sulumeti (1972-1976), appointed Bishop here

Other priests of this diocese who became bishops
John Oballa Owaa, appointed Bishop of Ngong in 2012
Emmanuel Okombo Wandera (priest here, 1972-1987), appointed Bishop of Kericho in 2003
Linus Okok Okwach, appointed bishop of Homa Bay 18 October 1993, resigned, 20 Feb 2002, died 12 September 2020

See also 
 List of Catholic dioceses in Kenya

Sources and external links 
 GCatholic.org - data for all sections

Roman Catholic dioceses in Kenya
Kisumu
A